Deyvid Oprja (born February 17, 1982 in Tallinn) is an Estonian alpine skier. He represented Estonia at the 2006 Winter Olympics in Turin and at the 2010 Winter Olympics in Vancouver.

References

1982 births
Living people
Sportspeople from Tallinn
Alpine skiers at the 2006 Winter Olympics
Alpine skiers at the 2010 Winter Olympics
Estonian male alpine skiers
Olympic alpine skiers of Estonia